Eden College may refer to:

Eden College (International) - based in London and Dublin, known for Visa scandal
 Eden College Durban, a college in Durban, South Africa
 Eden College Mauritius, a boy only and a girl only college in Mauritius
 Eden College of Technology, a computer information system Technology college in Bamenda Cameroon
 Eden Mohila College, a women's college in Dhaka, Bangladesh
 Eden College, a futsal club in the Republic of Ireland 
 Eden Junior College, a college in India